This is a list of Belgian television related events from 2009.

Events

Debuts

Television shows

1990s
Samson en Gert (1990–present)
Familie (1991–present)
Thuis (1995–present)

2000s
Idool (2003-2011)
Mega Mindy (2006–present)
Sterren op de Dansvloer (2006–2013)

Ending this year

Births

Deaths